Natoas Peak is located in the Lewis Range, Glacier National Park in the U.S. state of Montana.

First ascent by Bruce Murphy and Bill Mathews, August 1964.

See also
 Mountains and mountain ranges of Glacier National Park (U.S.)

References

Natoas
Natoas
Lewis Range
Mountains of Montana